Pandit Tejendra Narayan Majumdar (born 17 May 1961) is an Indian sarod player and pupil of Bahadur Khan. Majumdar is one of the most popular and celebrated modern sarod players.

Training
He started his music training under his grandfather Bibhuti Ranjan Majumdar with mandolin.  He also received vocal and tabla training under Amaresh Chowdhury and Anil Palit. Later he trained under Bahadur Khan for 18 years until the latter died.  He then continued training under Ajay Sinha Roy and Ali Akbar Khan.

Duets
He has played duets with Shujaat Khan. The rendering of raag Charukeshi is especially notable.

Music direction
He directed music for a Bengali movie called Tollylights, directed by Arjun Chakraborty.  He is also directing music for another Bengali movie Hanankaal due to be released in 2010.

Awards
He stood first in the All India Radio music competition in 1981 and was awarded the President's gold medal and the Pandit D. V. Paluskar award. He was awarded the Sangeet Natak Akademi Award for 2018.

Personal life
He is married to Manasi Majumdar and has one son, Indrayudh.

References

1961 births
Hindustani instrumentalists
Sarod players
Living people
Indian classical musicians of Bengal
Recipients of the Sangeet Natak Akademi Award
Musicians from Kolkata